Philip John Pritchard (born 9 January 1965) is an English former professional footballer who played in the Football League for Southend United.

Career
Pritchard was born in Wordsley and began his career with Stoke City. He failed to break into the first team at Stoke and joined Third Division side Southend United on loan for the 1983–84 season where he made 9 appearances before playing non-league football with Stafford Rangers.

Career statistics
Source:

References

1965 births
Living people
English footballers
Association football goalkeepers
English Football League players
Stoke City F.C. players
Southend United F.C. players
Stafford Rangers F.C. players